Ban Hin Khon station is a railway station located in Hin Khon Subdistrict, Chakkarat District, Nakhon Ratchasima Province.

References 

Railway stations in Thailand
Nakhon Ratchasima province